Genital torture (sometimes called genitorture) may refer to:

 A technique used in torture, the non-consensual infliction of suffering
 Cock and ball torture, a BDSM practice
 Pussy torture, a BDSM practice

See also
Breast torture, a BDSM practice
Genitorturers, a rock band

BDSM terminology